Fanfare for the Warriors is a 1973 album by the Art Ensemble of Chicago first released on the Atlantic label. It features performances by Lester Bowie, Joseph Jarman, Roscoe Mitchell, Malachi Favors Maghostut and Don Moye along with AACM leader Muhal Richard Abrams.

Reception
The Allmusic review by Scott Yanow states "The Art Ensemble of Chicago's first (and arguably most significant) period concluded with this high-quality studio session... all of the selections have their own musical personality. It's a fine showcase for this important avant-garde unit".

Track listing
 "Illistrum" (Malachi Favors) - 8:17
 "Barnyard Scuffel Shuffel" (Lester Bowie) - 5:12
 "Nonaah" (Roscoe Mitchell) - 5:44
 "Fanfare for the Warriors" (Jospeph Jarman) - 7:58
 "What's to Say" (Jarman) - 4:02
 "Tnoona" (Mitchell) - 6:25
 "The Key" (Mitchell) -  1:15

Personnel
Lester Bowie: trumpet, percussion instruments
Malachi Favors Maghostut: bass, percussion instruments, vocals
Joseph Jarman: saxophones, clarinets, percussion instruments
Roscoe Mitchell: saxophones, clarinets, flute, percussion instruments
Don Moye: drums, percussion
Muhal Richard Abrams: piano

References

1973 albums
Atlantic Records albums
Art Ensemble of Chicago albums